Richland is a historic home at Harwood, Anne Arundel County, Maryland. It was constructed for gentleman farmer Robert Murray Cheston (1849–1904) and his wife, the former Mary Murray (1859–1943). It is the only known late-19th-century rural Anne Arundel County dwelling definitively associated with a specific architectural firm. The plans were prepared by the Roanoke, Virginia based architectural firm of Noland and de Saussure, founded by William C. Noland. The home reflects both the Colonial Revival and Queen Anne styles. The house on the 332 acre Richland farm was built in 1893. In the 1950s, the Cheston family subdivided the property and sold the house with approximately 58 acres to the Talliaferro family, and sold the remaining acreage to the Catterton family. The Talliaferro family named their new parcel "Thanksgiving Farm". In 1996, the Heimbuch family purchased Thanksgiving Farm from the Talliaferro family, began planting vineyards1998, completed a restoration of the house in 2004, and opened a winery on the property in 2006.

It was listed on the National Register of Historic Places in 2007.

References

External links
Thanksgiving Farm Winery website
, at Maryland Historical Trust

Houses on the National Register of Historic Places in Maryland
Houses in Anne Arundel County, Maryland
Queen Anne architecture in Maryland
Colonial Revival architecture in Maryland
Houses completed in 1893
National Register of Historic Places in Anne Arundel County, Maryland
1893 establishments in Maryland